Geoff(rey) or Jeff(rey) Cox may refer to:

Sports
Jeff Cox (born 1955), American baseball coach 
Geoff Cox (footballer) (1934–2014), English winger

Others
Geoffrey Cox (journalist) (1910–2008), New Zealand-born British journalist and diplomat
Geoffrey Cox (Australian politician) (1914–1964), Liberal legislator
Geoff Cox (born 1951), Australian musician and media personality
Jeff Cox (judge) (born 1962), Louisiana judge
Jeffrey N. Cox (born 1954), American academic 
Geoffrey Cox (British politician) (born 1960), barrister and Member of Parliament
Jeffrey Cox (born 1971), American lawyer and military historian, involved in 2011 Wisconsin protests
Jeffrey David Cox (born 1951), American union leader

See also
Cox (surname)